Prunus cornuta, the Himalayan bird cherry, is a species of bird cherry native to the foothills of the Himalayas, including China and the countries of the Indian subcontinent. A medium-sized tree, it can reach 18m. It is used for a rootstock for sweet cherries in India. Its specific epithet references the "horned" deformation of the fruit seen when a tree is afflicted with the fungal disease pocket plum gall, ascribed to the species Taphrina padi.

References

External links
 

Bird cherries
cornuta
Flora of Asia
Flora of China
Flora of the Indian subcontinent
Plants described in  1841